Kaykhusraw I ( or Ghiyāth ad-Dīn Kaykhusraw ibn Kilij Arslān), the eleventh and youngest son of Kilij Arslan II, was Seljuk Sultan of Rûm. He succeeded his father in 1192, but had to fight his brothers for control of the Sultanate, losing to his brother Suleiman II in 1196. He ruled it 1192–1196 and 1205–1211.

Name 
The name "Kaykhusraw" is based on the name of the legendary Shahnameh hero Kay Khosrow.

Background 
Kaykhusraw's date of birth is unknown. He was the eleventh and youngest son of Kilij Arslan II. His mother was of Byzantine ancestry. Kaykhusraw received a good education during his upbringing, learning other languages besides his native Turkish, which was Persian, Arabic, and Greek.

Marriage
Kaykhusraw married a daughter of Manuel Maurozomes. Manuel Maurozomes would hold the castles of Chonae and Laodicea as a vassal of Kaykhusraw.

Reign
In 1192/93, Kaykhusraw returned the Byzantine nobleman, Theodore Mangaphas, to Emperor Isaac II after receiving assurances of Mangaphas treatment. With his brother, Rukn ad-Din Suleiman Shah, quickly advancing towards Konya, Kaykhusraw fled to Constantinople in 1196. He lived in Constantinople from 1197–1203, possibly even being baptised. A mathnawi written by Kaykhusraw himself compares his destiny during that period to that of the legendary Iranian hero Jam (Jamshid), who had to go into exile after losing his divine fortune (farr).

After Suleiman's death and Kilij Arslan's ascension to the sultanate, Kaykhusraw forced his way into Konya, removed Kilij from power and was enthroned for a second time.

Kaykhusraw seized Antalya in 1207 from its Niceaen garrison which furnished the Seljuk sultanate with a port on the Mediterranean. It was during this year, Kaykhusraw founded a mosque in Antalya.

Kaykhusraw was killed at the Battle of Antioch on the Meander in 1211. His son Kayqubad I, by Manuel Maurozomes' daughter, ruled the Sultanate from 1220 to 1237, and his grandson, Kaykhusraw II, ruled from 1237 to 1246. Kaykhusraw's body was taken to Konya, where it was buried in the ancestral tomb of his family.

Identity
According to Rustam Shukurov, Kaykhusraw I "had dual Christian and Muslim identity, an identity which was further complicated by dual Turkic/Persian and Greek ethnic identity".

Culture
Kaykhusraw wrote poetry in Persian. Muhammad ibn Ali Rawandi (died after 1207) dedicated his historical chronicle of the Seljuk Empire, Rahat al-sudur wa-ayat al-surur, to Kaykhusraw.

References

Sources

 

 

1211 deaths
Sultans of Rum
Monarchs killed in action
Byzantine–Seljuk wars
Year of birth unknown
13th-century Turkic people